Veillon is a surname. Notable people with the surname include:

Auguste Veillon (1834–1890), Swiss painter
Brod Veillon (born  1950), United States Air Force general